The Bellmac 32 is a microprocessor developed by Bell Labs' processor division in 1980, implemented using CMOS technology and was the first microprocessor that could move 32 bits in one clock cycle. The microprocessor contains 150,000 transistors and improved on the speed of CMOS design by using "domino circuits". It was designed with the C programming language in mind. After its creation, an improved version was produced called the Bellmac 32A, then cancelled along with its successor, the "Hobbit" C-language Reduced Instruction Set Processor (CRISP).

History
The Bellmac 32 processor was developed by AT&T engineers in three different Bell Labs locations: Indian Hill, Homdel and Murray Hill.

As the designers did not have automation tools, every chip designer had to use colored pencils for the completion of the initial design. Later, Steve Law developed a computer program that aided in the digitization of the initial designs.

The development of the Bellmac 32 produced a novel circuit design technique called domino logic, deemed a breakthrough for the production of the microprocessor. Tests performed during manufacture indicated that a clock frequency even higher than the 4 MHz target speed was possible. Implementing the control logic, however, proved unexpectedly complicated. These complications limited the final speed, when the entire chip was finished and tested, to 2 MHz. The team considered it as progress, but not as successful, as it could not meet the initial AT&T design goals.

Followup design meetings resulted in the Bellmac 32A project, as a second generation of the Bellmac microprocessor. The project once again selected CMOS technology and fixed the target clock frequency at 6.2 MHz. Adjustments to maximize the size of transistors and resistors and minimizing interconnections were fundamental in meeting the specifications. The engineers placed a 20-foot-by-20-foot engineering drawing of the chip layout on the floor of a large room. Testing of chips produced from the completed circuit exceeded the design speed, and reached clock frequencies of 7, 8, and even 9 MHz.

After the breakup of AT&T, Bell Labs became a component of Western Electric. With this change, the Bellmac 32 was renamed to WE 32000. Updated versions of the chip included the WE 32100 and WE 32200 processors.

Architecture
The Bellmac 32 has a pipelined architecture with an instruction fetch unit that serves to control access to main memory, and an execution unit which serves to monitor the process and manipulate data.

The instruction queue is filled with the instructions fetched from the memory. The address arithmetic unit serves for address calculations.

Bellmac 32 hardware is able to store all instructions, data and register contents associated with a process during a context switch.

Registers

Bellmac 32 has sixteen 32-bit registers. Three of these (ISP, PCBP, PSW) are privileged, used to support the operating system and can be written only when the microprocessor is in kernel mode. There are three other registers (SP, AP, FP) that are used by some instructions as stack pointers. Execution level, set in the Processor Status Word, can be one of four states: Kernel, Executive, Supervisor, User.

There are an additional sixteen registers in the WE 32200, these being divided into two groups of eight registers: R16 to R23 being user registers, readable and writable in any processor mode, being intended for global variable and temporary storage; R24 to R31 being kernel, or privileged, registers that are only writable in kernel mode, being readable in any other mode. These additional registers were introduced to allow high-level language compilers to generate code that could use them to store frequently used data, thus improving the execution performance of such languages.

Processor status word 
The Process Status Word is part of the register file and is aliased as R11.

Instructions
This microprocessor has 169 instructions, which are optimized for executing programs written in the C programming language. Accordingly, the format of character strings is adapted to C language specifications, for example.

The instructions may have up to three operands. The processor has no floating-point or decimal arithmetic instructions, which were later provided by coprocessors WE 32106 and WE 32206.

Memory
The Bellmac 32 implements multiple types of memory addressing, such as linear, immediate 8, 16 or 32 bits, registration, register indirect, short shift, absolute and indirect displacement of 8, 16 or 32 bits.

Usage
The WE 32x00 processors were used in the AT&T Computer Systems' 3B series computers.

Supporting chips
AT&T had a lineup of WE 32x00 supporting chips and peripherals, including:
 WE 32101 / 32201 Memory Management Unit
 WE 32102 Clock (10, 14, 18, or 24 MHz)
 WE 32103 DRAM Controller
 WE 32104 / 32204 DMA Controller
 WE 32106 / 32206 Math Acceleration Unit
 WE 321SB VMEbus Single Board Computer
 WE 321EB Evaluation Board

References

External links
 First-Hand: The AT&T BELLMAC-32 Microprocessor Development. http://www.ieeeghn.org/wiki/index.php/First-Hand:The_AT%26T_BELLMAC-32_Microprocessor_Development
 Personal computers. Towards a world of computing machines. Appendix B: About microprocessors. Author: Fernando Sáez Cows. http://www.quadernsdigitals.net/datos_web/biblioteca/l_516/enLinea/8.pdf
 AT&T Tech Channel Archives: Microprocessor for the Information Age   (video)

AT&T computers
Bell Labs
32-bit microprocessors